Serge Berstein (born in 1934) is a French historian, well known as a specialist of the French Third Republic.

He is a teacher at Institut d'Études Politiques de Paris.

References 

20th-century French historians
Historians of France
Officers of the Ordre national du Mérite
Living people
1934 births
French male non-fiction writers